"Look at Her Now" is a song by American singer Selena Gomez. It was released on October 24, 2019, by Interscope Records as the second single from her third studio album Rare (2020), a day after "Lose You to Love Me". The song was written by Gomez, Julia Michaels, Justin Tranter and its producer Ian Kirkpatrick. It has been described as a dance-pop, electropop and synth-pop song. The song reached the top ten in Flanders, Greece, Latvia, and Slovakia, as well as the top forty in seventeen additional countries, including The United States, where it peaked at number 27. The song received widespread acclaim from music critics, with many praising its production and self-confidence message.

Critical reception
The song received widespread acclaim from music critics.  Madeline Roth from MTV News called the track a "fresh tune", and an "upbeat, danceable track that unabashedly celebrates her post-heartbreak bounce-back". Roth also wrote that the song was "her way of assuring fans, and herself, that she's moving on in stunning fashion". Writing for Entertainment Tonight, Zach Seemayer found that the lyrics "explores the confidence that can be regained when you find yourself after a split". In an article for Rolling Stone, Brittany Spanos described the song as an "upbeat, club-primed song" that "sounds like a part two to "Lose You to Love Me"". Chris Murphy, in an article by Vulture, saw Gomez as an "incredibly famous girl singing in the third person about getting over her incredibly famous ex-boyfriend". While quoting lyrics from the song, Murphy wrote that Gomez "has entered a new phase of her life. She’s now Selena 2.0". Lake Schatz from Consequence of Sound felt that the track "encourages self-love and perseverance". Alyssa Bailey from Elle wrote that the song was a "far more splashy take on a boy cheating on her". Mike Nied from Idolator wrote that Gomez "sings over simmering beats" while she "celebrates her perseverance after a devastating breakup". Nied also called the chorus "instantly hummable" and that it was "an absolute earworm that is bound to dominate radio for months to come". Writing for Paper Magazine, Michael Love Michael described the track as "confident" and that it was a "club-ready refresh, with an infectious 'mmm' chorus", and described the beat as "bouncy and "minimal". Tino Kolokathis from Elite Daily wrote that the chorus "gives fans major techno vibes", and called the song as a whole "empowering", and also wrote that the lyrics of the track "will have you saying, 'Yaaaas, girl!'".

Uproxx listed the song as one of the best songs of 2020

Commercial performance
After one day of tracking, the song debuted at number three on the US Billboard Bubbling Under Hot 100 Singles chart, and entered the US Billboard Hot 100 at number 27 a week after, earning her her eighteenth top-forty entry on the chart. That same week, the song debuted at number 26 in the UK and number 29 in Australia. The song entered the top 20 on charts in Canada, Ireland, Norway, Singapore, and Switzerland. It also debuted in the top 10 of Greece, Latvia and Slovakia.

Music video
The music video, which was released the same day as the song, features Gomez and background dancers, dancing in a very colorful tent. Like the "Lose You to Love Me" music video, it was also fully shot on an iPhone 11 Pro, and was also directed by Sophie Muller. The video's aesthetic was inspired by early 2000s pop and R&B, specifically referencing music videos by Aaliyah, Britney Spears and Missy Elliott.

Live performances
The song, along with "Lose You to Love Me" was first performed at the 2019 American Music Awards as the opening number on November 24, 2019.

Credits and personnel
Credits adapted from the liner notes of Rare.

Recording locations
 Recorded at Interscope Studios (Santa Monica, California)
 Mixed at Larrabee Studios (North Hollywood, California)
 Mastered at Sterling Sound (Edgewater, New Jersey)

Personnel

Selena Gomez – vocals, songwriter
Julia Michaels – songwriter, backing vocals
Justin Tranter – songwriter
Ian Kirkpatrick – producer, songwriter, engineer, vocal producer, instrumentation
Andrew Boyd – assistant recording engineer
Sedrick Moore II – assistant recording engineer
 Bart Schoudel – engineer, vocal producer
 Chris Gehringer – mastering engineer
 Manny Marroquin – mixer
Chris Galland – mix engineer
Robin Florent – assistant mix engineer
Scott Desmarais – assistant mix engineer
Jeremie Inhaber – assistant mix engineer

Charts

Certifications

Release history

References

2019 singles
2019 songs
Interscope Records singles
Selena Gomez songs
Songs written by Selena Gomez
Songs written by Julia Michaels
Songs written by Justin Tranter
Song recordings produced by Ian Kirkpatrick (record producer)
Music videos directed by Sophie Muller